"Season of the Witch" is a song by Scottish singer-songwriter Donovan released in August 1966 on his third studio album, Sunshine Superman. The song is credited to Donovan, although sometime collaborator Shawn Phillips has also claimed authorship. Because of a dispute with Donovan's record company, a UK edition with the song was not released until June 1967.

Composition and recording
"Season of the Witch" was recorded at the CBS studios in Hollywood, California, where most of Sunshine Superman was recorded.  According to Donovan, he and Phillips wanted a "rock-combo sound" for the song and chose some local musicians from the local clubs. They included Lenny Matlin on keyboards, Don Brown on lead electric guitar, Bobby Ray on bass and "Fast" Eddie Hoh on drums.  Donovan played the second guitar part, as he explained in his autobiography:

Donovan does not mention the involvement of Jimmy Page and John Paul Jones. At the time, the two future Led Zeppelin members were popular London session musicians and played on other Donovan sessions, including in 1968 for "Hurdy Gurdy Man". However, their exact contributions, if any, to "Season of the Witch" are unknown.

Critical reception
In a retrospective song review for AllMusic, Lindsay Planer commented: "Few songs so perfectly reflect the dawn of the psychedelic pop era as aptly as Donovan's 'Season of the Witch'... Both lyrically as well as musically, the languid and trippy contents project a dark foreboding atmosphere [and] a sort of sinister tale of paranoia and the paranormal".  John Bush called the song "easily [one of the two] the highlights of the album... a chugging eve-of-destruction tale".

Cover versions
Several artists have recorded their own renditions, including Julie Driscoll with Brian Auger and the Trinity (1967; Open); Al Kooper and Steve Stills (1968; Super Session); Terry Reid (1968; Bang Bang You're Terry Reid); Vanilla Fudge (1968; Renaissance)(#52 Canada); Lou Rawls (1969; Your Good Thing); Luna (1996; I Shot Andy Warhol soundtrack); Hole (1997, My Body, the Hand Grenade); Dr. John with the Blues Brothers Band (1998, Blues Brothers 2000 soundtrack); Joan Jett and the Blackhearts (2004; Naked) and Lana Del Rey (2019; Scary Stories to Tell in the Dark soundtrack).

In popular culture
"Season of the Witch" is the opening theme for the TV series Britannia.

Two versions of the song are used to punctuate the 2012 British black comedy Sightseers —  that of Vanilla Fudge and the one by Julie Driscoll with Brian Auger & The Trinity.

References

1966 songs
Donovan songs
Song recordings produced by Mickie Most
Songs written by Donovan